A Guide for the Married Man is a 1967 American bedroom-farce comedy film starring Walter Matthau, Robert Morse, and Inger Stevens. It was directed by Gene Kelly. It features many cameos, including Lucille Ball, Jack Benny, Terry-Thomas, Jayne Mansfield, Sid Caesar, Carl Reiner, Joey Bishop, Art Carney, and Wally Cox. The title song, performed by The Turtles, was composed by John Williams with lyrics by Leslie Bricusse.

Plot
Paul Manning discovers one day that his dear friend and neighbor Ed Stander has been cheating on his wife. Curious, he asks Ed about it, and is given the history and tactics of men who have successfully committed adultery. With each new story, Paul cannot help noticing the attractive blonde, Irma Johnson, who lives nearby.

Paul gets close to cheating on his wife, Ruth, but he never quite goes through with it. In a scene near the end of the movie, he is finally in a motel room with another woman, a wealthy divorced client.  Paul hears shouting outside, and when he looks out the window, he sees photographers taking pictures of his friend Ed in bed with Mrs. Johnson. Paul takes this opportunity to flee the scene and run home to his beloved wife.

Cast
 Walter Matthau as Paul Manning
 Inger Stevens as Ruth Manning
 Sue Ane Langdon as Irma Johnson
 Robert Morse as Ed Stander
 Elaine Devry as Jocelyn
 Jackie Joseph as Janet Brophy
 Aline Towne as Mousey Man's Wife
 Claire Kelly as Harriet Stander
 Eve Brent as Joe X's Blowsy Blonde
 Marvin Brody as Taxi Driver
 Jackie Russell as Miss Harris, Manning's Secretary
 Majel Barrett as Mrs. Fred V.
 Linda Harrison as Miss Stardust
 Chanin Hale as Miss Crenshaw

Cameo appearances
 Lucille Ball as Mrs. Joe X
 Jack Benny as Ollie 'Sweet Lips'
 Polly Bergen as Clara Brown
 Joey Bishop as Charlie
 Ben Blue as Shoeless
 Sid Caesar as Man at Romanoff's
 Art Carney as Joe X
 Wally Cox as Man Married 14 Years
 Ann Morgan Guilbert as Charlie's Wife
 Jeffrey Hunter as Mountain Climber
 Marty Ingels as Meat Eater
 Sam Jaffe as Shrink
 Jayne Mansfield as Girl with Harold
 Hal March as Man Who Loses Coat
 Louis Nye as Irving, House Buyer
 Carl Reiner as Rance G.
 Michael Romanoff as Romanoff's Maitre'd
 Phil Silvers as Realtor
 Terry-Thomas as Harold 'Tiger'
 Delores Wells as Girl with Wally Cox
 Heather Young as Girl with Megaphone

Reception

Critical response
A Guide for the Married Man is simply "a series of dumb skits" in Pauline Kael's estimation, and the famous names in the cast are all wasted: "what they do is no more memorable than the plugs for brand-name products that are scattered throughout". Film critic Bosley Crowther of The New York Times greatly enjoyed the movie, calling it "The broadest and funniest farce to come out of Hollywood since the Russians came last year...who would imagine that a film pretending to be a how-to on infidelity would be funny or even in good taste?" and adding "what is thoroughly and delightfully disarming about this mischievous film is the impudent candor of it and its freedom from the leer." The staff at Variety wrote in their review: "Walter Matthau plays a married innocent, eager to stray under the tutelage of friend and neighbor Robert Morse. But this long-married hubby is so retarded in his Immorality (it takes him 12 years to get the seven-year-itch) that, between his natural reluctance and mentor Morse's suggestions (interlarded with warnings against hastiness), he needs the entire film to have his mind made up." Film critic Roger Ebert of Chicago Sun-Times wrote in his review: "There are a lot of funny people in this movie, but they are not very funny people in this movie, Gertrude Stein might have said. The Casino Royale syndrome has struck again in A Guide for the Married Man, and we are forced to sit and watch as dozens of big-name stars jostle each other for their moment before the cameras."

Release
According to Fox records, A Guide for the Married Man needed to earn $5,900,000 in rentals to break even, and made $7,355,000, meaning it made a profit.

Home media
The film was released on DVD on September 6, 2005, by 20th Century Fox Home Entertainment.

See also
 List of American films of 1967
 Jack Benny filmography

References

Further reading

External links

 
 
 
 
 

1967 films
1960s sex comedy films
20th Century Fox films
Adultery in films
American sex comedy films
1960s English-language films
Films scored by John Williams
Films directed by Gene Kelly
1967 comedy films
1960s American films